Spinacanthidae is an extinct prehistoric family of tetraodontid bony fish that lived from the Lutetian epoch of Eocene Monte Bolca.

In life, either genus would have resembled a somewhat-flattened boxfish with five massive spines along the anterior-dorsal side, with the longest spine directly above the forehead, and the shortest spine directly in front of the dorsal fin.  Protobalistum is distinguished from its close, sympatric relative, Spinacanthus, in that its scales are large, and form a sort of armor.  In Spinacanthus, the individual scales are relatively small, and do not touch each other.

Protobalistum and Spinacanthus were a part of the ecosystem of the lagoon that became Monte Bolca.  Because of their similarity to boxfish, and due to their close relation to modern-day triggerfish, spinacanthids may have preyed on shellfish and small fish.

See also

 Eospinus, another close relative from the Earliest Eocene of Turkmenistan
 Eolactoria, another extinct tetraodontid from Monte Bolca
 Proaracana, another extinct tetraodontid from Monte Bolca
 Prehistoric fish
 List of prehistoric bony fish

References
A remarkable new genus of Tetraodontiform fish with features of both Balistids and Ostraciids from the Eocene of Turkmenistan (contains a brief discussion and description of Spinacanthidae)

 
Prehistoric ray-finned fish families